Yury Koziyatko (born April 24, 1964 in Brest, Belarus) is a Belarusian politician, TV presenter and propagandist. He has been accused of propaganda supporting and justifying human rights violations in Belarus and included in a sanctions list of the European Union in 2011-2016.

Biography

Koziyatko graduated from the Kurgan Higher Military-Political Aviation School in Kurgan, Russia. During his service at the Soviet Army, he worked as a military journalist in a newspaper of the Soviet Pacific Fleet and as a TV host in Vladivostok, Russia.

In the early 1990s Koziyatko quit the Russian Army and returned to Belarus. He first worked for a Belarusian military TV production company and than changed to the main state-owned TV channel Belarus-1 where he became a political commentator.

In 2003 he became Chairman at the state-owned TV channel ONT. In 2005 Koziyatko became Chairman at a different state-owned TV channel, Capital TV.

In 2012 Koziyatko was appointed member of the upper chamber of the Parliament of Belarus.

Accusations, EU sanctions
In 2011, after the wave of repressions that followed the 2010 presidential election, Yury Koziyatko and several other top managers and employees of major state media became subject to an EU travel ban and asset freeze as part of a sanctions list of 208 individuals responsible for political repressions, electoral fraud and propaganda in Belarus. The sanctions were lifted in 2016.

According to the EU Council's decision, Koziyatko's TV show was described as "an instrument of state propaganda which supports and justifies the repression of the democratic opposition and of civil society. Democratic opposition and civil society are systematically highlighted in a negative and derogatory way using falsified information. He was particularly active in this regard after the crackdown on peaceful demonstrations on 19 December 2010 and on subsequent protests.

See also
 List of people and organizations sanctioned in relation to human rights violations in Belarus
 National State Television and Radio Company of the Republic of Belarus

References

Living people
1964 births
Belarusian propagandists
People from Brest, Belarus
Russian military personnel
Members of the Council of the Republic of Belarus
Belarusian television presenters
Belarusian media executives